National Highway 343, commonly referred to as NH 343 is a national highway in  India. It is a spur road of National Highway 43. NH-343 traverses the states of Chhattisgarh and Jharkhand in India.

Route 
Chhattisgarh
Ambikapur, Semarsot, Ramanujganj,
Jharkhand

Chhattishgarh/Jharkhand Border –Garhwa.

Junctions  
 
 Terminal with National Highway 43 near Ambikapur.
 Terminal with National Highway 39 near Garhwa.

See also 

 List of National Highways in India by highway number
 List of National Highways in India by state

References

External links 

 NH 343 on OpenStreetMap

National highways in India
National Highways in Chhattisgarh
National Highways in Jharkhand